Power Assets Holdings Limited, formerly Hongkong Electric Holdings Limited, is a vertically integrated electric utility company. It is the majority shareholder in the Hongkong Electric Company, having reduced its holding in the company through a series of share sales, the most recent being in June 2015.

The company owns significant holdings in a number of energy providers and networks around the world, in partnership with its parent company Cheung Kong Infrastructure Holdings, which holds a 38.87% stake in the business.

Holdings
Power Assets Holdings has shareholdings in the following businesses:
 The Hongkong Electric Company (33.37%) - one of the two suppliers of electricity in the Hong Kong electricity market.
 Associated Technical Services Limited
 SA Power Networks, Australia - acquired in 2000
 Powercor Australia, - acquired in 2000
 CitiPower, Australia - acquired in 2002 and jointly owned by HEC's parent Cheung Kong International
 Ratchaburi Power Company Limited, Thailand - 25% stake with Ratchaburi Power Company
 Northern Gas Networks, UK - 41.29% (19.9% stake acquired in 2005)
 Wellington Electricity Distribution Network - 50% acquired in 2007
 UK Power Networks - 40%
 Wales & West Utilities - 30%
 Canadian Power Holdings Inc. - 50%
 Husky Midstream Limited Partnership - 48.75%
 Dutch Enviro Energy - 27%
 Energy Developments Limited - 20%
 Jinwan Power Plant - 45%
 Dali and Laoting Wind Farms - 45%

References

External links

 
 

Companies listed on the Hong Kong Stock Exchange
CK Hutchison Holdings
Electric power companies of Hong Kong
Companies in the Hang Seng Index
Energy companies established in 1976
1976 establishments in Hong Kong